Gmina Lubomierz is an urban-rural gmina (administrative district) in Lwówek Śląski County, Lower Silesian Voivodeship, in south-western Poland.

Neighbouring gminas
Gmina Lubomierz is bordered by the gminas of Gryfów Śląski, Lwówek Śląski, Mirsk, Stara Kamienica and Wleń.

Villages
Apart from the town of Lubomierz, the gmina contains the villages of Chmieleń, Golejów, Janice, Maciejowiec, Milęcice, Oleszna Podgórska, Pasiecznik, Pławna Dolna, Pławna Górna, Pokrzywnik, Popielówek, Radoniów and Wojciechów.

Twin towns – sister cities

Gmina Lubomierz is twinned with:

 Mszana Dolna, Poland
 Tanvald, Czech Republic
 Terebovlia, Ukraine
 Wittichenau, Germany
 Zbarazh, Ukraine

References

Lubomierz
Lwówek Śląski County